My Cherie Amour is an album by American singer-songwriter Stevie Wonder released on the Tamla (Motown) label on August 29, 1969, his eleventh studio album. The album yielded a couple of Top 10 hits in the Billboard Hot 100, including the title track (#4) and "Yester-Me, Yester-You, Yesterday" (#7), as well as Wonder's takes on the 1967 hit "Light My Fire" by The Doors, "Hello, Young Lovers" from The King and I and "The Shadow of Your Smile" from the 1965 film The Sandpiper. It reached #12 in the UK album chart and #34 in the Billboard 200 album charts.

Track listing 

Side one
 "My Cherie Amour" (Henry Cosby, Sylvia Moy, Stevie Wonder) – 2:49
 "Hello, Young Lovers" (Oscar Hammerstein, Richard Rodgers) – 3:09
 "At Last" (Mack Gordon, Harry Warren) – 2:44
 "Light My Fire" (John Densmore, Robby Krieger, Ray Manzarek, Jim Morrison) – 3:34
 "The Shadow of Your Smile" (Johnny Mandel, Paul Francis Webster) – 2:38
 "You and Me" (Beatrice Verdi, Deke Richards) – 2:41
Side two
 "Pearl" (Richard Morris) – 2:42
 "Somebody Knows, Somebody Cares" (Cosby, Moy, Lula Mae Hardaway, Wonder) – 2:30
 "Yester-Me, Yester-You, Yesterday" (Ron Miller, Bryan Wells) - 3:01
 "Angie Girl" (Cosby, Moy, Wonder) – 2:57
 "Give Your Love" (Cosby, Don Hunter, Wonder) – 3:42
 "I've Got You" (Moy, Wonder) – 2:33

Personnel 

 Stevie Wonder – harmonica, keyboards, vocals
 James Jamerson – bass
 Benny Benjamin – drums
 Henry Cosby – producer

References 

Stevie Wonder albums
1969 albums
Tamla Records albums
Motown albums
Albums produced by Henry Cosby
Albums recorded at Hitsville U.S.A.